"Where My Girls At?" is a song by American girl group 702, released as the first single from their self-titled second studio album (1999) on April 27, 1999. The track was produced by Missy Elliott and Keybeats.

Originally intended to be included on fellow girl group TLC's third studio album, FanMail, the group rejected the song, so 702 recorded it instead. The song has been certified Gold by the Recording Industry Association of America (RIAA), and Billboard ranked it at  46 on their list of the "100 Greatest Girl Group Songs of All Time".

Track listings

US CD
 "Where My Girls At?" (Radio Edit) – 2:47
 "Where My Girls At?" (Instrumental) – 4:02
 "Make Time" (Snippet) – 1:06
 "Tell Your Girl" (Snippet) – 1:03
 "Gotta Leave" (Snippet) – 1:13
 "You'll Just Never Know" (Snippet) – 1:11

US 12-inch vinyl
A1. "Where My Girls At?" (Radio Edit) – 2:47
A2. "Where My Girls At?" (Instrumental) – 4:02
B1. "Where My Girls At?" (Radio Edit) – 2:47
B2. "Where My Girls At?" (TV track) – 4:02

UK 12-inch vinyl
A1. "Where My Girls At?" (Album Version) – 2:47
A2. "Where My Girls At?" (Allstar Remix) – 3:40
B1. "Where My Girls At?" (Fanatic Remix) – 3:44
B2. "Where My Girls At?" (Fanatic Rock Mix) – 3:45

European CD
 "Where My Girls At?" (Allstar Remix) – 3:40
 "Where My Girls At?" (Fanatic Remix) – 3:44

Chart performance
"Where My Girls At?" peaked at No. 4 on the Billboard Hot 100 on June 19, 1999. It peaked at No. 3 on the Hot R&B/Hip-Hop Songs charts and at No. 1 on the Rhythmic Top 40 chart. The single remained in the Top 20 on the Billboard Hot 100 chart for more than 30 weeks.

Weekly charts

Year-end charts

Certifications

|}

Release history

References

1999 singles
702 (group) songs
Music videos directed by Bille Woodruff
Songs written by Missy Elliott
1999 songs
Motown singles